A third-party inspection agency (TPIA or TPI) is a business organization, complying with the ISO 17020 standards. Third-party inspection or "Category A" is the most stringent of the 3 categories of inspection organization that the standard specifies. Such organizations are third-party inspection agencies that must not be involved in any activities other than inspection and testing. Based on this requirement, the third-party inspection agency must not be involved in design, procurement, fabrication, construction, or installation. All companies and parties such as buyers, sellers, engineering companies, plant owners must have access to these agencies and use their services. Confidentiality, independence, impartiality, and integrity are important conditions for being a third-party Inspection agency.

Four types of quality inspection
 A pre-production inspection tells the buyer which kind of raw materials (or components) will be used. Factories are often suspected of lowering their costs by purchasing substandard materials, and this can be disastrous for the buyer (e.g. the wrong kind of chip in an electronic device).
 A during production inspection (often called “DUPRO” in the industry) allows the buyer to have an idea of average product quality, early in the production cycle. It is the most useful and the most underrated tool at the disposal of importers, who often only rely on final inspections.
 The final random inspection (also called “pre-shipment inspection”) is by far the most common type of QC check. It takes place once 100% of shipment quantity is finished and at least 80% is packed, so it can be a real random inspection (this is not exactly the case if the quality is checked earlier) and suppliers cannot play games.
 The container loading inspection, like the pre-production inspection, is seldom used. But it can be a worthwhile option in some specific cases.

References 

Quality control